is a Japanese composer who has provided the music for several popular anime series including the first five Pretty Cure series, X, Eureka Seven, Sword of the Stranger, and Blood-C. He graduated from the Tokyo College of Music in 1993. At the 29th Japan Academy Prize in 2006, he won the Best Music prize for his work on the film  Always Sanchōme no Yūhi (Always Sunset on Third Street). He also composed music for anime films such as Pretty Cure All Stars DX trilogy, Stand By Me Doraemon.  In live-action dramas, he provided music and soundtracks for TV dramas Good Luck!! Water Boys, H2: Kimi to Ita Hibi and Ryōmaden.  He provided the music for the Space Battleship Yamato film, as well as the Rurouni Kenshin and Parasyte live-action film series. For the 38th Japan Academy Prize in 2015, he was nominated in the Best Score category for his work in The Eternal Zero. While he did not win the award, The Eternal Zero won several awards including Best Picture, and Stand By Me Doraemon won for Best Animated Film.
He composed the music for victory ceremonies at the 2020 Olympic Games in Tokyo.

Filmography

Anime

Live-action

References

 Books

External links
 Official agency profile at facemusic 
 
 
 
 Naoki Sato profile at Oricon 

1970 births
Anime composers
Japanese composers
Japanese film score composers
Japanese male composers
Japanese male film score composers
Living people
Musicians from Chiba Prefecture